Hirske, or Gorskoye, is a city in the Sievierodonetsk Raion of the Luhansk Oblast (region) of Ukraine. Population: .

Geography 

History 
Starting mid-April 2014 pro-Russian separatists captured several towns in Donetsk Oblast; including Hirske. On 13 August 2014, Ukrainian forces reportedly secured the city from the pro-Russian separatists. However, on 1 September 2014 it was recaptured again.

On 7 October 2014, to facilitate the governance of Luhansk Oblast, the Verkhovna Rada made some changes in the administrative divisions, so that the localities in the government-controlled areas were grouped into districts. In particular, the towns of Hirske and Zolote and the urban-type settlements of Nyzhnie and Toshkivka were transferred from Pervomaisk Municipality to Popasna Raion.

Hirske was placed under the de facto control of the Luhansk People's Republic on 23 June 2022, after it was captured by advancing Russian and LPR forces during the battle of Donbas.

Demographics 
Native language as of the Ukrainian Census of 2001:
Ukrainian  53.2%
Russian  41.6%
Belarusian  0.5%
Moldovan (Romanian)  0.1%

References 

Cities in Luhansk Oblast
Sievierodonetsk Raion
Populated places established in the Russian Empire
Territorial disputes of Ukraine